Nevada Public Radio was founded in 1980 as a public corporation to operate publicly funded radio in southern Nevada.  NPR operates six stations in Nevada and five retransmitters.

History
Nevada Public Radio was first incorporated in 1975.  Five years later, KNPR signed on as the first NPR member in Nevada.  For its first 19 years on the air, it operated from space donated by Sam Boyd in Sam's Town Casino.

In 2003, KNPR split its offerings into two stations.  NPR news and talk remained on KNPR, while classical music moved to a new station, KCNV.

Stations
KNPR is a non-commercial radio station located in Las Vegas, Nevada, broadcasting on 88.9 FM.  KNPR airs news/talk programming syndicated by National Public Radio.

KNPR's programming is simulcast on five full-power satellite stations.
KTPH Tonopah (91.7)
KLNR Panaca (91.7)
KWPR Lund (88.7)
KLKR Elko (89.3)
KVNV Reno (89.1)

Additionally, KNPR operates low-powered translators throughout southern Nevada, as well as in Lake Havasu City, Arizona and Ridgecrest, California

KCNV is a non-commercial radio station located in Las Vegas broadcasting on 89.7 FM.  KCNV airs a classical music format syndicated by Classical 24.

External links
Nevada Public Radio
KCNV Official Website

Mass media in Nevada
NPR member networks